Matthäus Zell (also Mathias Zell; anglicized as Matthew Zell) (21 September 1477, in Kaysersberg – 9 January 1548, in Strasbourg) was a Lutheran pastor and an early Protestant reformer based in Strasbourg. He joined the Reformation as early as 1521.

His widow was Katharina Zell.

Life 
Zell was the son of a wine maker in Kaysersberg. He studied at the Universities of Mainz, Erfurt and Freiburg im Breisgau. His compatriot Johann Geiler von Kaysersberg exerted a strong influence on him.

References

General references
 Allgemeine Deutsche Biographie, ADB 45 (1900), 17ff.
 Realenzyklopädie für protestantische Theologie und Kirche, Band 21 Seite 650
 
 T. W. Röhricht. Matthäus Zell (Mitt. a. d. Gesch. d. ev. K. d. Elsasses 3). Straßburg 1855, 84-154. 
 W. Baum. Capito und Bucer. Elberfeld 1860, 195ff.
 Ficker-Winkelmann. Handschriftenproben 2. Straßburg 1905, 55.
 J. Adam. Ev. kg d. Stadt Straßburg. Straßburg 1922.
 Martin Bucers Deutsche Schriften 1, Gütersloh 1960, 31 u. ö.
 M. Weyer, L'Apologie chrétienne du réformateur strasbourgeois Matthieu Zell (Christliche Verantwortung, 1523), 3 Bde., Diss; Université de Strasbourg, 1981.
 M. Weyer, Martin Bucer et les Zell : Une solidarité critique, dans Martin Bucer and Sixteenth Century Europe. Actes du colloque de Strasbourg (28-31 août 1991), éd. par Christian Krieger et Marc Lienhard, 2 vol., Leiden-New York-Köln, 1993, p. 275-295 
 M. Weyer, "Matthieu Zell", in: Nouveau dictionnaire de biographie alsacienne, Strasbourg (Fédération des Sociétés d'Histoire et d'Archéologie d'Alsace) 2003.

1477 births
1548 deaths
People from Kaysersberg-Vignoble
16th-century German Lutheran clergy
Johannes Gutenberg University Mainz alumni
University of Erfurt alumni
German Protestant Reformers